Mariano Melgar Airport  is an airport serving the agricultural district of La Joya in the Arequipa Region of Peru. It is named after Peruvian patriot Mariano Melgar. It also serves as the La Joya Air Base.

See also
Transport in Peru
List of airports in Peru

References

External links
OpenStreetMap - Mariano Melgar
OurAirports - Mariano Melgar

Airports in Peru
Buildings and structures in Arequipa Region